Thomas Ringer (1883–1969) was a British boxer. He competed in the men's featherweight event at the 1908 Summer Olympics. He fought as Tom Ringer.

Ringer won the 1906 Amateur Boxing Association British bantamweight title, when boxing out of the Lynn ABC.

References

External links
 

1883 births
1969 deaths
British male boxers
Olympic boxers of Great Britain
Boxers at the 1908 Summer Olympics
Place of birth missing
Featherweight boxers